Amphipneustes koehleri is a species of sea urchin of the family Temnopleuridae. Their armour is covered with spines. It is placed in the genus Amphipneustes and lives in the sea. Amphipneustes koehleri was first scientifically described in 1905 by Ole Mortensen.

See also 
Amphipneustes brevisternalis (Koehler, 1926)
Amphipneustes davidi (Madon-Senez, 2010)
Amphipneustes lorioli (Koehler, 1901)

References 

Amphipneustes
Animals described in 1905
Taxa named by Ole Theodor Jensen Mortensen